Anjaparavanda Bopaiah Subbaiah is a former Indian hockey goalkeeper and coach.

Early life 

He was born in Madikeri (Kodagu district, Karnataka) into the Kodava community. He played hockey for his school, St. Michael's Madikeri, as a fourteen year old. He was a product of Sports Authority of India (SAI) hostel, Bangalore.

Career 
Subbaiah has participated in the Commonwealth games. He was part of the 1998 gold-winning Asian Games Indian team. He is a recipient of the Arjuna Award. Between 1988 and 1998, he took part in 285 international matches. He represented and captained the Indian hockey team between the years 1987 and 2007.

Awards 

Subbaiah was conferred with an honorary doctorate from the Mangalore University by Hans Raj Bhardwaj, Governor of Karnataka.

Retirement 

He is a commentator, coach, manager, administrator, umpire and selector as well. He was part of the Hockey India disciplinary panel as well. A B Subbaiah is also part of the 13-member Hockey India committee. He is the Hockey Karnataka secretary since 2018.

References 

Olympic field hockey players of India
Indian male field hockey players
Recipients of the Arjuna Award
Indian field hockey coaches
Kodava people
Living people
People from Kodagu district
Field hockey players from Karnataka
Year of birth missing (living people)
Asian Games medalists in field hockey
Asian Games gold medalists for India
Asian Games silver medalists for India
Medalists at the 1990 Asian Games
Medalists at the 1994 Asian Games
Medalists at the 1998 Asian Games
Field hockey players at the 1990 Asian Games
Field hockey players at the 1994 Asian Games
Field hockey players at the 1998 Asian Games